Pat Kesi (born September 10, 1973) is a former American football offensive linemen. He played college ball at Washington. His hometown is Las Vegas, Nevada.

College career
While attending Washington, Kesi received the nickname "Calves" due to his massive 22-inch calves. As a junior and senior he started all 11 games. While a sophomore he played in all 11 games and started 3. He was part of the offensive line that paved the way for Napoleon Kaufman's record breaking 1,890-yard rushing season.

Pro-career
Kesi was undrafted on the 1996 NFL Draft. However, that same year he was signed by the Oakland Raiders. In 1997, he was originally signed by the Dallas Cowboys where he was mentored under Mark Tuinei. Tuinei even gave Pat some free shoes due to the fact that Kesi did not have a shoe contract at the time. Green Bay Packers and was a member of the special teams making 4 tackles in 6 games. He was released by the Packers and was signed by the Philadelphia Eagles. Again he played special teams and earned the special teams player spot on Pro-Football Weekly's all-rookie team. He was released by the Eagles at the conclusion of the season. In 2000, he was the 188th pick in the XFL Draft by the Las Vegas Outlaws.

Personal
He was born in American Samoa to father Sinuka and mother Flonda. He has two brothers and two sisters. He attended Farrington High School where he played for coach Edward Diaz. Besides football, he competed in track where he threw the shot put and discus. At Washington his majored in Ethnic Studies.

References

External links
Just Sports Stats

1973 births
Living people
American sportspeople of Samoan descent
American football offensive linemen
Canadian football offensive linemen
American players of Canadian football
Washington Huskies football players
Dallas Cowboys players
Oakland Raiders players
Philadelphia Eagles players
Green Bay Packers players
Winnipeg Blue Bombers players
Toronto Argonauts players
Las Vegas Outlaws (XFL) players
Players of American football from American Samoa